Wilferdingen is the largest district of the municipality of Remchingen in the Enzkreis region of Baden-Württemberg, Germany.

History 
In former times Wilferdingen was inhabited by Romans. At the Niemandsberg in Wilferdingen an old Roman house could be excavated. Wilferdingen was an independent municipality until 1973. On January 1, 1973, Wilferdingen merged with Singen to form the municipality of Remchingen.

Geography 
Wilferdingen is located in the center of Remchingen. It is central and is bordered by Singen and Darmsbach. Darmsbach borders the district at the southwestern tip. The northern border of Wilferdingen converges at the border of Singen. The river Pfinz, which is a tributary of the Rhine, runs through Wilferdingen.

Transportation 
Through Wilferdingen runs the Bundesstraße 10 which leads further to Karlsruhe and Pforzheim. There are also bus stops in Wilferdingen. On the border between Wilferdingen and Singen runs the railroad line Karlsruhe-Mühlacker. Thus, there is the station Wilferdingen-Singen in Wilferdingen. The station also connects Wilferdingen and Singen with the help of an underpass. From the station you can get to Karlsruhe, Pforzheim and Stuttgart, among other places. Light rail, Interregio-Express and Regional-Express stop here. Furthermore, a small airfield can be found in Wilferdingen.

Tourism

Museums 
There are two museums in Wilferdingen. The Roman Museum Remchingen is a museum in Wilferdingen. There an old Roman house is exhibited together with other exhibits. There is also a telephone booth museum on the Wilferdingen side of the railroad tracks at the "Old Signal Box", which exhibits telephones and telephone booths.

References

External links 

 Site on remchingen.de

Remchingen
Villages in Baden-Württemberg